Shangyuan Art Museum is a modern art museum in Beijing, China. A private museum, it was established in 2007. It hosts an International Residency Programme, with participants coming from all around the world.

See also
 List of museums in China

References

External links
Official site
Official Facebook Page

Art museums and galleries in China
Museums in Beijing
Modern art museums in China
2007 establishments in China